Roqicheh Rural District is a rural district (dehestan) in Kadkan District, Torbat-e Heydarieh County, Razavi Khorasan Province, Iran. At the 2006 census, its population was 3,582, in 897 families.  The rural district has 13 villages.

References 

Rural Districts of Razavi Khorasan Province
Torbat-e Heydarieh County